The 2014 Cal Poly Mustangs football team represented California Polytechnic State University in the 2014 NCAA Division I FCS football season. The Mustangs were led by sixth year head coach Tim Walsh and played their home games at Alex G. Spanos Stadium. They were members of the Big Sky Conference. They finished the season 7–5, 5–3 in Big Sky play to finish in a tie for fifth place.

Schedule

Despite also being a member of the Big Sky Conference, the game with Portland State on September 20 is considered a non conference game and will have no effect on the Big Sky Standings.

Ranking movements

References

Cal Poly
Cal Poly Mustangs football seasons
Cal Poly Mustangs football